Goniophila is a genus of moths of the family Erebidae. The genus was erected by George Hampson in 1926.

Species
Goniophila ashleyi (Holloway, 2005) Borneo
Goniophila excavata (Swinhoe, 1905) Sundaland
Goniophila hampsoni (Leech, 1900) western China
Goniophila lichenea (Holland, 1900) Buru
Goniophila niphosticha Hampson, 1926 Myanmar, Thailand, Borneo
Goniophila polymima de Joannis, 1929 Vietnam

References

External links
Original description: Hampson, George F. (1926). Descriptions of New Genera and Species of Lepidoptera Phalaenae of the Subfamily Noctuinae (Noctuidae) in the British Museum (Natural History): 342.

Calpinae